Persona 5: Dancing in Starlight is a rhythm game developed and published by Atlus for the PlayStation 4 and PlayStation Vita. Forming part of the Persona series—itself part of the larger Megami Tensei franchise—the game features the central cast of the 2016 role-playing video game Persona 5. Gameplay focuses on characters from Persona 5 taking part in rhythm-based gameplay set to original and remixed music from Persona 5. It was released in Japan in May 2018, and worldwide in December 2018. The game received mixed reviews from critics.

Development began in 2015 following the release and positive reception of Persona 4: Dancing All Night. Multiple staff returned from Dancing All Night, including character designer Shigenori Soejima and composer Ryota Kozuka. Dancing in Starlight was the second of two rhythm games planned as follow-ups to Dancing All Night, the other being the simultaneously-developed Persona 3: Dancing in Moonlight.

Premise and gameplay

Persona 5: Dancing in Starlight is a rhythm game based on the role-playing video game Persona 5. Featuring the central cast of Persona 5, gameplay follows a similar pattern to Persona 4: Dancing All Night; a chosen character performs a song in a story location from Persona 5, with the player using a six-button system to hit notes in time to the present musical track. During a section of the song called "Fever", a chosen partner joins in for the routine, with unique choreography for each partner reflecting the characters' relationship within Persona 5. Interactions between characters between songs take place in the Velvet Room, a recurring location in the Persona series.

Plot

Due to learning about how Margaret's guest, Yu Narukami, defeated Mikuratana-no-Kami in Persona 4: Dancing All Night by dancing, Caroline and Justine become jealous, as does Elizabeth in Persona 3: Dancing in Moonlight. Due to this, the sisters challenge each other to a dance off, to prove who has the better guest. The losers would be "sent to hell". Similar to Persona Q: Shadow of the Labyrinth, upon completion of the event, everyone's memories of the event will be erased. Summoning the Phantom Thieves of Hearts and the S.E.E.S. to dance, they are challenged to hype the crowd up as much as possible, the crowd being the Sea of Souls. The twins promise the Phantom Thieves a treasure if they dance for them. Due to the Velvet Room being between space and time, and the group being summoned in their dreams, they are able to visualise any dance they want, and their bodies perform the actions. After the completion of the ball, Justine, Caroline, and Elizabeth decide that competing to see who had the best guest was pointless, and declare both sides to have won. They then reveal the prize was the experience, which the group accept as they had fun. The twins then add an additional reward, seeing the two of them dance as well.

Development and release
Development of Dancing in Starlight began in 2015 following the positive feedback from Dancing All Night; it was created by P-Studio, an internal Atlus department responsible for managing the Persona series. While the team were initially encouraged to develop Persona 3: Dancing in Moonlight as a standalone title, the fact that Persona 5 was also in development prompted them to create a rhythm game based upon it. Development of the two games ran concurrently, with the team using their experience from Dancing All Night to improve the experience for their new projects. The development proved challenging as the team were creating two game's worth of content at the same time. Kazuhisa Wada, who produced and directed Dancing All Night, returned as producer. Originally intending to produce and direct again, the game was instead directed by Nobuyoshi Miwa. Shigenori Soejima returned as character designer. The game was developed for both PlayStation 4 (PS4) and PlayStation Vita, with the main difference being that the PS4 version ran at a higher frame rate. The team initially intended to have both Dancing titles as a single game, but decided against this due to the two projects' contrasting identities.

In Dancing All Night each character was assigned a dance genre and given limited moves due to their lack of experience in the game's story, but Dancing in Starlight allowed for customised choreography based on character personalities. To increase the variety of dance moves between characters, each character had a specific dancer and unique choreography. In contrast to the acrobatic choreography of Dancing in Moonlight, the team worked with the dancers to give the cast of Dancing in Starlight realistic dance routines. The visual quality of character models was raised from that present in Dancing All Night. They also moved more smoothly due to a large number of "double joint" parts in the internal skeleton not present in the models for Dancing All Night. The movement of clothing—which was based solely on physics calculations in Dancing All Night—used a combination of physics and clothing material combined with character choreography.

While a story mode and new location were used in Dancing All Night, the team decided to replace it with a system based on character interactions within the original settings and scenario, though a minor story took place anyway. This decision was made following talks between Wada and Miwa. Compared to the simplistic setting design of Dancing in Moonlight, the team needed to work much harder creating the varied and complex backgrounds for Dancing in Starlight. Due to the game's tone compared to the main Persona series, the team felt had greater freedom to put lighter and colorful elements into Dancing in Starlight.

Dancing in Starlight features 26 musical tracks from Persona 5, with original music being composed by Ryota Kozuka, who had previously worked on Dancing All Night. Remixes of tracks from Persona 5 were supervised by Kozuka, and original composers Shoji Meguro, Atsushi Kitajoh, and Toshiki Konishi. Additional remixes were handled by Jazztronik, tofubeats, KAIEN and Taku Takahashi. The list of tracks that would be included was modified throughout the development process. When creating the original theme song, the team had greater freedom due to the musical style of Persona 5 being the most recent release.

The game was first announced in August 2017 alongside Dancing in Moonlight and the spin-off title Persona Q2. The game was released in Japan on May 24, 2018. Downloadable content (DLC) featuring new costumes and music was also released. Two special editions were created for PS4 and Vita. The PS4 version came with physical copies of Dancing in Starlight and Dancing in Moonlight, a download code for the digital-exclusive PS4 port of Dancing All Night, and a full soundtrack. The Vita version included Dancing in Starlight and Dancing in Moonlight, the full soundtrack, and costume DLC based on protagonists from the wider Megami Tensei series. The game also supports PlayStation VR. The game was retitled as Persona 5: Dancing in Starlight for its worldwide release on December 4, 2018.

Reception

Awards
The game was nominated for "Game, Music or Performance-Based" and "Song Collection" at the National Academy of Video Game Trade Reviewers Awards.

Notes

References

External links
 

2018 video games
Atlus games
Music video games
PlayStation Vita games
PlayStation 4 games
Persona (series)
Persona 5
Video games set in Japan
Video games developed in Japan
PlayStation VR games
Video games set in 2017